Masahudu Alhassan (born 1 December 1992) is a Ghanaian professional footballer who plays as a left-back. He made eight appearances for the Ghana national team between 2011 and 2012.

Club career
Alhassan spent his early career with the youth team of Ghanaian club Prampram Mighty Royals, before joining the youth team of Italian club Rimini, before later signing for Genoa, where he made his professional debut.

In January 2013, it was announced that Serie A club Udinese had signed Alhassan on a co-ownership deal, for €1.5 million, as part of Antonio Floro Flores's deal. Udinese also signed Alexander Merkel in the same deal. In June 2013 Udinese signed Alhassan outright for another €620,000.

On 4 August 2013, he joined Latina on a loan deal. In January 2015 he returned to Latina. He moved to Albanian club Teuta Durrës in January 2018.

On 6 September 2018, Al-Ain has signed  Alhassan for one seasons from Teuta Durrës. On 26 February 2020, Alhassan joined Finnish club Turun Palloseura for one year.

International career
Alhassan was part of the Ghana national under-20 football team at the 2011 African Youth Championship.

On 7 November 2011, Alhassan was called up to the Ghana senior squad to face Sierra Leone and Gabon.

In December 2011, Alhassan was named to the Ghana's provisional 25-man squad for the 2012 Africa Cup of Nations, and in January 2012 he was selected for the tournament's 23-man squad.

Career statistics

Club

International

References

1992 births
Living people
Ghanaian footballers
Association football fullbacks
Ghana international footballers
2012 Africa Cup of Nations players
Rimini F.C. 1912 players
Genoa C.F.C. players
Novara F.C. players
Udinese Calcio players
Latina Calcio 1932 players
A.C. Perugia Calcio players
KF Teuta Durrës players
Al-Ain FC (Saudi Arabia) players
Turun Palloseura footballers
Serie A players
Serie B players
Kategoria Superiore players
Saudi First Division League players
Ghanaian expatriate footballers
Ghanaian expatriate sportspeople in Italy
Ghanaian expatriate sportspeople in Albania
Ghanaian expatriate sportspeople in Saudi Arabia
Ghanaian expatriate sportspeople in Finland
Expatriate footballers in Italy
Expatriate footballers in Albania
Expatriate footballers in Saudi Arabia
Expatriate footballers in Finland